Aloe ikiorum  is a species of Aloe native to northeast Uganda. The name references the Ik people indigenous to the area.

References

ikiorum
Plants described in 2011
Flora of Uganda